HP Inc. targets their line of business desktop computers for use in the corporate, government, and education markets. HP operate their business desktops on minimum 12-month product cycle. Their major competitors are- Dell OptiPlex, Acer Veriton, and Lenovo ThinkCentre.

HP's market share for their business line of desktops in 2010 was estimated to be 18.7 percent in 2022.

HP's business desktops are available as number of brand names including HP Business, HP Pro, HP Elite.

Models

Pro Series (Entry Level)

HP's entry-level business desktops typically include 2 memory slots, as opposed to 4 in the higher tier ranges, thus limiting the maximum amount of RAM that can be installed. Units typically use lower tier motherboards with cheaper and less feature-rich chipsets.

Advanced/Pro Series

Elite Series

TWR - Tower
(C)MT - (Convertible) Minitower
ST - Slim Tower
SFF - Small Form Factor
US(DT) - Ultra-slim (Desktop)
DM - Desktop Mini
AIO - All-in-One

Z series (workstation)

References

See also
List of Hewlett-Packard products

business desktops
Lists of computer hardware
Computer-related introductions in 2003
Business desktop computers